This is an incomplete list of the cotton and other textile mills that were located within the modern-day boundaries of the ceremonial county of Lancashire, England. The first mills were built in the 1760s, in Derbyshire using the Arkwright system and were powered by the water. When stationary steam engines were introduced they still needed water, so the mills were built along rivers and canals. As a broad rule of thumb, spinning mills were built in the south-east of the county, and weaving sheds to the north and west.  Parts of Lancashire have been subsumed into Greater Manchester and Merseyside, and are not included in this list. Parts of Yorkshire are now included in this county.

Accrington

'Home of Howard & Bullough'

Bacup

Rossendale

Source 1891 data: Grace's Guide

Barnacre

Barnoldswick

Blackburn

'Home of Northrop Loom Works' and William Dickinson

Brierfield

Burnley

The home of Butterworth & Dickinson and Queen Street Mill Textile Museum

Cheesden Valley

Chipping

Chorley

Clitheroe

Colne

Coppull

Darwen

Earby

Dolphinholme and Ellel

Farington

Great Harwood
Great Harwood - Map of Mills

Harle Syke

Haslingden and Helmshore

Home of S.S.Stott and Co  and Helmshore Mills Textile Museum

Hoghton

Kirkham

Nelson

Oswaldtwistle and Stanhill

Home to James Hargreaves

Padiham

Preston

Ramsbottom

Rawtenstall

Rishton

Sabden

Samlesbury

Trawden

Walton le Dale

||

Whalley

Whitworth

Withnell

See also

List of mills in Greater Manchester, for other mills historically in Lancashire
:Category:Lists of textile mills in the United Kingdom
List of mills owned by the Lancashire Cotton Corporation Limited

References

Bibliography

External links

 
Lancashire
.
History of Lancashire
Lists of buildings and structures in Lancashire